

B'wana Beast

Baby-Doll

Bad Samaritan
The Bad Samaritan (alias Zviad Baazovi) is a supervillain, and enemy of the Outsiders who first appeared in The Outsiders #3 (January 1986). He is a former Soviet spymaster who became a neutral party after the cold war, to which became a valued asset for Checkmate.

Bad Samaritan in other media
Zviad Baazovi appears in Young Justice, voiced by Yuri Lowenthal. This version has psychic powers, and is a Markovian ambassador and member of the Light.

Bane

Baron Bedlam

Baron Blitzkrieg

Barrage
Barrage is the name of a fictional character appearing in American comic books published by DC Comics.

Phillip Karnowski is a criminal who originally fought Maggie Sawyer and lost his right arm in the process. While incarcerated at Stryker's Island, Karnowski gained some favors from his fellow inmates where he built a high-tech armor that included an energy cannon arm that replaced his lost right arm. With this armor, Karnowski became Barrage and attacked the Metropolis Police Department's Special Victims Unit to get revenge on Maggie Sawyer. Barrage was defeated by Superman.

Barrage later escaped from prison and was recruited by Morgan Edge to join the Superman Revenge Squad and get revenge on Superman. The group was defeated by Superman.

Barrage in other media
 Phillip  Karnowski appears in media set in the Arrowverse.
 Karnowski first appears in the Supergirl episode "The Darkest Place", portrayed by Victor Zinck Jr. This version is a former Navy SEAL. After his wife Julie was murdered, Karnowski became a rogue vigilante who targets criminals that escaped justice on technicalities. He frames Guardian for the attacks before being defeated by Guardian and arrested by the National City Police Department.
 Karnowski appears in the Superman & Lois episode "The Ties That Bind", portrayed by Shaw Madsen. Due to changes made to the multiverse following the events of "Crisis on Infinite Earths", he is now an arms and drug dealer. After taking hostages and being confronted by Clark Kent, Karnowski inhales a substance that makes him as strong as the Man of Steel. Due to painful visions plaguing Superman at the time, Karnowski overpowers him until the former is defeated by Lieutenant General Mitch Anderson's superhero group.

Battalion

Batgirl

Batman

Batman Jones
Batman Jones is a Batman expert in the DC Universe.

The character, created by Jack Schiff and Bill Finger, first appeared in Batman #108 (June 1957). A rebnooted version appears in Battle for the Cowl interviewed by Vicki Vale.

Within the context of the stories, his parents were rescued by Batman shortly before Jones was born and they named him "Batman" as thanks. The boy grew up idolizing Batman and tried to become a crimefighter before he began collecting stamps. As an adult, he is an expert on Batman.

Bat-Mite

Batwing

Batwoman

Beard Hunter
Beard Hunter is a fictional character appearing in American comic books published by DC Comics.

Ernest Franklin was a disturbed and closeted gay assassin of bearded men who was hired the Bearded Gentlemen's Club of Metropolis to kill the Chief because he wouldn't sell his beard to them. He cannot grow a beard due to a male hormone deficiency according to his mother when she was visited by the police.

Beard Hunter in other media
Beard Hunter appears in Doom Patrol, portrayed by Tommy Snider. This version is a bounty hunter with the ability to track down individuals by consuming their facial hair. He was first seen in "Hair Patrol" where the Bureau of Normalcy hired him to track down Niles Caulder. Beard Hunter infiltrates Doom Manor and consumes some of Caulder's facial hair from the sink drain as means to track him. Vic and Rita find and interrogate him, but he is able to get free and overpower Vic. Later, the Beard Hunter tracks down an effigy of Caulder and Slava's creature appears and attacks him. The Doom Patrol's search for the Beard Hunter brings them to Danny the Street. In "Ezekiel Patrol", Beard Hunter was with Mr. Nobody when the Doom Patrol enacted a plan that involved Mr. Whiskers and Ezekiel the Cockroach fighting in giant size as Negative Man plans an explosion to take them out. When Beard Hunter asks Mr. Nobody what they are supposed to do, Mr. Nobody quotes "Oh sh--" before the explosion happens trapping them in the painting. In "Dumb Patrol", Crazy Jane's Miranda personality, Cyborg, Negative Man, and Roni Evers enter the White Space painting where they find Beard Hunter while Mr. Nobody isn't there. Beard Hunter explains to them that he landed an animated gig.

Beast Boy

Bekka

Khalid Ben-Hassin 

In 2013 several years after DC Comics rebooted the DC Universe through the New 52, a new incarnation of Doctor Fate would be created for the Earth 2 series named Khalid Ben-Hassin. Similarly to the Khalid Nassour incarnation (whom debuted 2 years after Ben-Hassin), the character is also of Egyptian descent raised in America. The character's descent was intentional by James Robinson, wanting an Egyptian character to hold the mantle Doctor Fate while still allowing to be Western but not making him a caricature. Unlike other versions of Fate prior to 2013, his spell-craft abilities are also centered on invoking Egyptian deities. Alongside his creation also came a redesign of the Doctor Fate enemy, Wotan.

Ben-Hassin was raised by Kent Nelson, whom served as his legal guardian and studied archaeology, specializing in knowledge of the occult and later earning a doctorate.

First appearing in "The Tower of Fate" storyline, it is revealed that two years prior, Khalid and Kendra Saunders-Munoz  were sent to uncover the Tomb of Nabu, the dwelling of a powerful mage, by the World Army, the ordeal in which gave Kendra her wings and revealed Khalid as being Nabu's chosen vessel. Instead of accepting its power, Khalid sent the Helm away with the remnant of power he gained after bearing the Helm for a brief time. Hesitant on accepting himself as Nabu's vessel since, he is later coerced when Wotan kidnaps him, Jay Garrick/Flash, and Jay's mother to force Khalid to retrieve the Helm within the Tower of Fate, which cannot be accessed by anyone else other than himself and those in his proximity. Inspired by Flash's heroism and bravery, he chooses to become Nabu's agent of order and chaos, christening himself "Doctor Fate". He battles Wotan and eventually prevails with the help of Nabu's deceased spirit and using his knowledge of Egyptian deities to banish Wotan.

Beppo

Bibbo Bibbowski

Big Barda

Billy Numerous
Billy Numerous (voiced by Jason Marsden) was specifically created for the Teen Titans animated series and did not have a previous appearance in the mainstream comics. He later appeared in comics starting in Catwoman (vol. 3) #78 (April 2008), now known as Repro.

Billy Numerous (real name William "Billy" Strayer) is a former student of the H.I.V.E. Academy and enemy of the Teen Titans. Numerous first appeared as a student of the H.I.V.E Academy, where his power of self-duplication was subtly hinted at. After the H.I.V.E. was destroyed during Cyborg's confrontation with Brother Blood, Numerous and most of the other students went freelance. Later, Numerous engaged in a robbing spree all across Jump City and he stole anything he and his innumerable clones could get his (their) collective hands on. His power thoroughly confounded the Titans, especially Cyborg, who became all the more obsessed in catching him. Finally, however, Cyborg realized that there was another way of catching Numerous. He and the other Titans confronted Numerous in the old stadium where he had stashed his loot, seemingly with numerous copies of themselves. To bring them down, Numerous created even more clones of himself, but finally pushed his powers too far. The resulting reabsorption of each of his clones caused a massive physical and mental shock, stunning him and enabling his capture.

At some point, Numerous entered Jinx's H.I.V.E. Five and was also recruited into the Brotherhood of Evil. As one of the Five, he participated in the attempted capture of Kid Flash, but even his numerous clones were unable to stop the super-speedster. Later, when the Brotherhood executed its worldwide strike against young superheroes, he and Gizmo were sent to capture Kole and Gnarrk in their subterranean retreat, but both heroes escaped them. When the remnants of the Titans under Beast Boy later attacked the Brotherhood's headquarters, Numerous and most of his H.I.V.E. Five teammates tried to run, but were intercepted by Kid Flash, aghast to see that Jinx had switched sides and joined up with him. Moments later, they were all swept away by one of Jinx's hexes and carted off by Kid Flash for flash-freeze treatment.
 
In Catwoman (vol. 3) #78 (April 2008), a character based on Billy Numerous named Repro appears. The small-time crook known as Repro was operating in Gotham City during the time when many of the city's criminals disappeared for a short time. He was one of the only two criminals left in the city, with the other being the Thief. Repro was a young and inexperienced criminal who only did small-time criminal activities, just enough to stay off the radar of big-time crime fighters. After a confrontation with Catwoman where he thought he had shot her in the chest, he hastily departed and ran to the Thief to tell him about it. He was, in turn, shot in the chest and killed by the Thief, who then dumped his body in an alley to cover up the murder.

Billy Numerous in other media 
 Billy Numerous appears in the Teen Titans Go! tie-in comics. He appears as a background villain and member of the H.I.V.E. Five in this comic adaptation of the animated television series. He engages in various petty crimes and attempts at one point to join a new iteration of the team being organised by Psimon and Dr. Light. He fails the test, along with dozens of other villains.
 Billy Numerous appears in Teen Titans Go!, voiced by Scott Menville. He is a minor supporting villain, typically appearing alongside the other H.I.V.E. Five members.

Bison-Black-as-Midnight-Sky
Bison-Black-as-Midnight-Sky is a Native American shaman in the DC Universe.

The character, created by Gerry Conway and Pat Broderick, first appeared in The Fury of Firestorm #1 (June 1982).

Within the context of the stories, Bison-Black-as-Midnight-Sky is the great-grandfather of Black Bison and the last great shaman of the Bison Cult. He resents his great-grandson's disrespect for the cult's traditions. When he is killed by muggers in Central Park, he binds his spirit to a magical amulet.

The amulet allows his spirit to influence or control his great-grandson when worn.

Bizarro

Black Adam

Black Alice

Black Beetle

Black Beetle is the name of a fictional character appearing in American comic books published by DC Comics.

Black Beetle in other media
Black Beetle appears in Young Justice, voiced by Kevin Grevioux.

Black Bison

Black Bison is the name of two supervillains in the DC Universe.

The character, created by Gerry Conway and Pat Broderick, first appeared in The Fury of Firestorm #1 (June 1982).

John Ravenhair
Within the context of the stories, John Ravenhair is a Native American-born Black-Cloud-in-Morning and raised in Queens, New York. When his great-grandfather, Bison-Black-as-Midnight-Sky, is killed in a mugging, he becomes influenced and possessed by his ancestor's spirit. This leads him to set about avenging the wrongs committed against the Native American people. When removed from the angry spirit, he occasionally acts for good, but is frequently a threat to Firestorm.

Black Bison is armed with a coup-stick that allows him to bring any inanimate objects to life and command them to aid him as well as manipulate weather, but it requires a special amulet that he wears to maintain its power. He is also trained in the martial arts.

Black-Cloud-in-Morning
In September 2011, The New 52 rebooted DC's continuity. In this new timeline, this version of Black Bison, along with the Hyena, Multiplex, Plastique and Typhoon, are sent by the Crime Syndicate to finish Gorilla Grodd's work. The villains end up defeated by the Rogues, since one of their targets is at the hospital where Captain Cold's sister is recovering.

In the Watchmen sequel Doomsday Clock, Black Bison is among the villains that attend the underground meeting held by the Riddler to talk about the Superman Theory. When Moonbow and Typhoon are stated to be creations of the government and Black Bison is near them, Black Bison states that he was not mentioned as having been created by the government.

Alternate versions of Black Bison
Black Bison appears in Injustice: Gods Among Uss prequel comic series.

Black Bison in other media
A female version of Black Bison named Mina Chaytan appears in The Flash, portrayed by Chelsea Kurtz. Introduced in the episode, "When Harry Met Harry...", she acquired the ability to bring effigies to life after being exposed to dark matter following the Flash's emergence from the Speed Force as part of the Thinker's plans. Using her powers, she targets collectors of Native American artifacts before she is defeated by Team Flash and remanded to Iron Heights Penitentiary. In the episode "True Colors", she, K%lgore, Hazard, and Dwarfstar attempt to escape after learning Warden Gregory Wolfe planned to sell them to Amunet Black, but the Thinker intercepts and kills them for their powers.

Black Canary

Black Condor

Black Flash

Black Hand

Black Lightning

Black Manta

Black Mask (character)

Black Orchid

Black Thorn

Vera Black

Vera Black aka Sister Superior is a British psionic cyborg in the DC Universe.

The character, created by Joe Kelly and Doug Mahnke, first appeared in JLA #100 (August 2004). The storyline set up the limited series Justice League Elite which consisted of 12 issues published between 2004 and 2005.

Within the context of the stories, Vera Black is the sister of Manchester Black. As children their parents would often fight and Manchester would take her out to play to avoid them. As his idea of "play" became killing sprees, Vera's perspective became twisted. When her brother dies after attempting to destroy Superman, she has her ruined arms, lost in an untold childhood incident, replaced with cybernetic prostheses which can configure into any weapon she desires, initially contemplating revenge on Superman before she decides to be better than her brother.

Her new abilities result in her leading the remnants of the Elite and tacitly working with the Justice League. This leads to the League, encouraged by the Flash, asking her to lead a new team with the intention that she will handle black ops missions that the League cannot due to what they represent to the public, primarily involving hunting down and eliminating metahuman threats before they go public. Starting with Coldcast and Menagerie, she adds Flash, Manitou Raven, Major Disaster, Green Arrow and Kasumi to the team. She also enlists Naif al-Sheikh to keep the team in check and serve as a liaison to the governments of the world.

Equipment of Vera Black
Vera's cybernetic arms have the capacity to transform into an almost unlimited variety of melee, projectile and beam weapons. They also incorporate camouflage technology relying on optics, as well as altering sense perception in others.

Vera Black in other media
Vera Black appears in Superman vs. The Elite, voiced by Marcella Lentz-Pope as an adult and by Tara Strong as a girl in a flashback sequence.

Black Vulcan

Blackbriar Thorn
Blackbriar Thorn was a High Priest of the ancient Druids of Cymru. When his entire sect is massacred by attacking Roman forces, Thorn flees to the surrounding forest. Attempting to escape capture, he transforms himself into solid wood, hiding amongst the trees. For Thorn's dismay, the agony of his dying comrades creates a geological upheaval which buries his newly arboreal form underground.	

Millennia later, Blackbriar Thorn's body is unearthed by an archaeologist and subsequently displayed at the Gotham City Museum of History. When moonlight strikes the statue on the night of its unveiling, Thorn is revived and begins to wreak havoc upon the Museum and its patrons, which includes the alter egos of Superman and Etrigan the Demon. The heroic pair's actions drive Thorn to retreat into the city, where he later attempts to procure a new body—-that of Superman. Together, Etrigan and Superman defeat Thorn, rendering him incorporeal.

Blackbriar Thorn appears, seemingly in human form, during the Crisis on Infinite Earths. He, Etrigan, and other assembled mystics lend their combined energies-—channeled through Doctor Occult and Green Lantern Alan Scott—-to successfully defeat the Anti-Monitor's Shadow Demons, which had been ravaging the Earth.

Disembodied once more and said to have lingered in Gotham Park since his prior defeat, Thorn is channeled by a stage psychic at the behest of John Constantine to provide information about a pending calamity in The Green.

Blackbriar Thorn next appears (again, with a human appearance) as an agent of the demon Neron in a demonic realm called The Abyss. Holding captive the soul of Mollie Scott as bait, Thorn attempts to ensnare her husband, Alan Scott, but is surprised to find Alan no longer vulnerable to wood.

As part of Johnny Sorrow's version of the Injustice Society, a more woody-looking Thorn and his teammates are defeated by Wildcat as they invade the JSA's Headquarters. Thorn's defeat left his body splintered into pieces, one shard of which is kept on display in JSA Headquarters. Thorn lies dormant until the Injustice Society's next attack. Using a crossbow, Injustice Society comrade Tigress shoots the splintered sliver of Blackbriar Thorn into Alan Scott's chest. Apparently once more susceptible to wood, Scott is gravely wounded as Thorn regenerates from the embedded projectile and proceeds to inflict more damage. Thorn is ultimately defeated in this siege on the JSA by Stargirl.

Blackbriar Thorn appears most recently in Day of Vengeance battling the Spectre, who, influenced by Eclipso, attempts to kill all magic wielders in the DC Universe. The combatants appear in gigantic form. Thorn loses the battle, but delays his next regeneration to lend his powers, along with many other mystics, in a combined effort to defeat the Spectre.

Blackbriar Thorn is among the villains in the ambush of the JSA led by Tapeworm.

In The New 52 reboot of DC's continuity, Blackbriar Thorn is re-established as one of two powerful magical entities used by Nick Necro to combat the Justice League Dark. He tries to destroy Zatanna in Peru by controlling an entire forest with his magic. He is then possessed by Deadman and neutralized.

During the Forever Evil storyline Forever Evil: Blight, Blackbriar Thorn is among the magic users in the possession of Felix Faust and Nick Necro. Faust and Necro plan to use the magic users as part of a weapon to defeat the creature that destroyed the Crime Syndicate's Earth.

The character appears in the "DC Rebirth" relaunch as one of the villains refusing to be hired by Henry Bendix to kill Midnighter and Apollo.

Powers and abilities of Blackbriar Thorn 
Blackbriar Thorn has exhibited a plethora of abilities, including manipulation of the weather, extensive control over vegetation—either living or dead, the ability to regenerate from even a sliver of his physical form, and the creation of illusions. Thorn can draw strength and abilities though physical contact with the Earth itself. Inside buildings, he still retains the ability to control surrounding plant life, animating it to his will and frequently increasing its volume and strength. Thorn's organic manipulation of his own woody form, including the projection of tendrils and vines, appears to be uninhibited when separated from terra firma as well.

Blackbriar Thorn in other media 
Blackbriar Thorn appears in the Young Justice episode "Misplaced", voiced by Kevin Michael Richardson. He is recruited by Klarion the Witch Boy alongside Wotan, Wizard, and Felix Faust to cast a powerful spell from Roanoke Island that would separate the adults and children of Earth onto two separate worlds.

The Stargirl episode "Summer School: Chapter One" establishes that Blackbriar Thorn was associated with the Injustice Society. When Courtney Whitmore asked about his fate, Pat Dugan stated that he was slain by Green Lantern.

Blackhawk

Blackout

Blackout (Farooq) is a metahuman who can harness electricity. He makes his first appearance in Flashpoint (vol. 2) #1 (July 2011). In the alternate timeline created by the events of Flashpoint, Blackout is recruited by Cyborg into a team of superheroes whose mission was to end the Amazon-Atlantean war, which had devastated Europe and caused millions of human casualties. To that end, the team was assigned to take down both Emperor Aquaman and Wonder Woman.

Another new recruit, the Outsider, revealed during a meeting with Batman that he had been hunting Blackout so he could use his abilities to power India. This manhunt resulted in the loss of Blackout's girlfriend and his departure from school. Blackout has since voiced his reluctance to be part of the same team with his worst enemy.

Blackout in other media 
Farooq Gibran / Blackout appears in The Flash episode "Power Outage", portrayed by Michael Reventar. Prior to the series, he was with friends when the S.T.A.R. Labs particle accelerator exploded and electrocuted him. While he survived, he accidentally killed his friends when they tried to resuscitate him. Following this, he discovers he can siphon electrical energy and seeks revenge against the head of S.T.A.R. Labs, Harrison Wells. In pursuit of this goal, Farooq is confronted by the Flash, but he drains the hero's speed. He later storms S.T.A.R. Labs, kills Girder, and attacks Wells. However, the Flash is able to get his speed back and overcharge him, killing Farooq in the process.

Blackrock
Blackrock is a supervillain appearing in American comic books published by DC Comics. Blackrock is a recurring enemy of Superman first appearing in Action Comics #458 (April 1976).

Blackrock was the creation of Dr. Peter Silverstone in an attempt to increase ratings for the United Broadcasting television network. Silverstone hypnotized UB President Sam Tanner and later Tanner's nephew, Les Vegas, to fill the role. A third Blackrock (an energy construct) was created by Tanner's command not much later.

Eventually Silverstone assumed the mantle of Blackrock himself, using a powerful stone that could metabolize electromagnetic energy into energy to achieve flight, energy blasts and superhuman strength, and fought Superman several times. This rock, while a technological artifact, has the appearance of a polished gem that is as black as coal. It was appropriately dubbed the Blackrock.

The Post-Crisis version was stated (in Batman/Superman adventures) to be a symbiotic alien life form, rather than a creation of Dr. Silverstone. Its appearance and abilities are approximately the same.

Silverstone is the only Pre-Crisis user of the stone that has been mentioned in Post-Crisis continuity. Overuse of the Blackrock's powers blinded Silverstone and left him insane. He was found sitting muttering to himself and watching constant television shows in an apartment owned by an ex-convict named Samuel Benjamin, who beat Silverstone to death with the Blackrock and took it for himself. Despite its power, his inexperience with the Blackrock led to his defeat and Superman took the stone and threw it towards the Sun.

A short time later, Alexander Luthor Jr., disguised as Lex Luthor, dispatched Bizarro to retrieve the Blackrock from the Sun before passing it on to a South American woman named Lucia, a drug smuggler and revolutionary who had been jailed by Superman before. Her intense feelings of hatred towards the Man of Steel matched those of the Blackrock and she proved particularly adept in using it. However, her skills were not enough to defeat Superman and the Blackrock withdrew into itself.

It was eventually shown that the Blackrock had been kept by Superman, who locked it away in his Fortress of Solitude. The Blackrock escaped and bonded with Plastic Man. Shortly after, the Blackrock was removed from Plastic Man and found its way into the hands of Batman, who shortly afterwards decided he needed its powers to help him stop a currently-rampaging Superman (Superman had fallen under the influence of Despero as he attempted to turn Earth's alien superheroes against humans). Although it remained on Batman after Superman threw off Despero's influence, Superman was able to force it to leave Batman by threatening to kill him, informing the Blackrock that he knew Batman would rather die than live like this.

In September 2011, The New 52 rebooted DC's continuity. In this new timeline, Blackrock is Bradley Glenn, an ex-con who was hired to star in a reality television show called Badass Nation about the life of a supervillain. The TV company provided him with powered armor and a fictional backstory about finding it in a crashed spacecraft. They intended to film him tearing up a bridge that was scheduled for demolition, but the crew neglected to ensure that the bridge had been closed to traffic and the Pre-Flashpoint Superman had to intervene.

The Post-Crisis wielders of the Blackrock seem to have developed differing powers based on their personalities. All seem to have possessed superhuman strength and endurance, flight and energy projection abilities. The Blackrock also has the ability to absorb ambient energy to empower its wielder. Dr. Silverstone seemed most adept at using its ability to process information from TV and radio signals. Samuel Benjamin was particularly skilled at using it to boost his own physical strength and toughness. Lucia's abilities seemed to be an amalgamation of her predecessors', but she seemed to prefer using its energy projection abilities and discovered a way to use it to drain Superman's power.

While the stone had bonded to Plastic Man, he was not shown using its abilities much.

Batman used it in much the same way that Lucia did, but Batman showed more of a preference for physical combat than Lucia did.

Jimmy Olsen and several other humans were bonded to the Blackrocks when a shower of them rained down on Earth. These people showed some level of superhuman abilities similar to those demonstrated by Lucia, etc. but it was not shown if they were as strong as he was.

Bradley Glenn's armor enabled him to leap great distances and an energy field around one gauntlet gave him a powerful punch.

Blackwing
Blackwing (Charles "Charlie" Bullock) is a superhero appearing in American comic books published by DC Comics. He was created by Paul Levitz, Joe Staton and Joey Cavalieri.

The character was chronologically introduced in Adventure Comics #464 (April 1979), but was unnamed in that comic. He was, however, named in his next appearance in Wonder Woman #281 (April 1981) and later, became Blackwing in Wonder Woman #297 (August 1982). Also, worth to note, the original story in Adventure Comics was intended for All Star Comics #75. Charlie was drawn as a teen in that story, but his next appearance (only three years later) depicts him as a young adult who graduated from law school.

In his mid-teens, Charles Bullock was searching for a direction in life. The teenager found it after he helped fight off street punks alongside Wildcat and was invited to join him at his gym. Charlie attended law school and later became a junior partner and top-notch researcher to the law firm called Cranston, Grayson and Wayne. When a criminal named Karnage broke into the office looking for his boss Arthur Cranston, this, and another event, led him to become the costumed hero Blackwing. Although his first outing as a crime fighter proved unsuccessful when he was captured by the costumed villain Boa's gang, Blackwing managed to contribute in freeing the Huntress from Boa's giant snake and recorded some evidence that was used to put the mastermind and his men away.

Since then, Blackwing has never appeared again in any other published story.

Blaze

Block
Block is a young Maori woman living in Melbourne, Australia, the woman dubbed the Human Block was once inexplicably struck by lightning and survived the incident. Unknown to her, this similar event had happened to many other individuals throughout time and was in fact the Speed Force imbuing her with speed-related abilities. In her then-present time—1957—Block acted as a side show attraction in a carnival, the prize of $1,000 going to whoever could move her, which was failed by many, as she had manipulated her body density. One drunken man staggered onto the stage to accept her challenge, making her move by insulting her Maori heritage rather than physically moving her. Angered, she immediately struck out at him and instigated a small brawl, tearing through the crowd before someone hastily drew their firearm on her and shot, only to find that not even bullets affected her. Before the now-turned mob could attack her, Zoom, accompanied by his newly recruited acolytes the Folded Man and Magali, appeared and teleported her outside of the carnival grounds. Being offered the chance to embrace her abilities and live as a godlike being after mastering them, she did not hesitate to join Zoom and his quest to kill the "evil" Flash. Along with the other Acolytes, she would train for what would be an unknown amount of time to kill the Flash, facing off with Zoom in his place. It is unknown how long this training took place, as they stated that, over the course of centuries, this team trained to take on the Flash and when they reached older age, Magali would revert them back to their original ages when joining. Unknown to Block, Zoom is actually the one to have orchestrated her joining him to begin with, appearing to the drunk man who challenged her, while convincing him that the way to make her move was to attack her heritage, as he had been keeping close watch on her for some time.

Powers and abilities of Block
Being imbued with the Speed Force, Block has the unique ability to slow down her atoms. In doing this, they become denser than steel and grant her invulnerability, super-strength and immobility. She can possibly slow down other speedsters, if not other people as well, through physical touch, as she stopped the Top's ability to spin and was able to hold Zoom in place in a headlock. After training centuries with Zoom, she is a deadly fighter. Recently, she was able to stop the molecules around herself to make the air unbreakable.

Block in other media
Block appears in The Flash episode "Blocked", portrayed by Erin Cummings. Vanessa Jansen, nicknamed "Block" by Cisco Black, was a weapons dealer who worked for the East Street Skulls gang until she was betrayed and sent to Iron Heights Penitentiary for four years. After becoming a metahuman with the ability to create boxes of dense air and getting out of Iron Heights, both by unknown means, she sought revenge on her former gang she was stopped by the Flash and XS. Before the heroes could re-incarcerate Jansen, she was attacked by Cicada. XS ran her to the hospital, but Jansen was mentioned to have died of her injuries on the way there.

Blok

Blockbuster

Bloodsport

Bloodwork

Bloodwork is a fictional character appearing in American comic books published by DC Comics.

Bloodwork in other media
Bloodwork appears in The Flash, portrayed by Sendhil Ramamurthy.

Blue Beetle

Blue Devil

Bombshell

Boodikka

Bolphunga

Bolphunga is an extraterrestrial bounty hunter in the DC Universe.

The character, created by Alan Moore and Dave Gibbons, first appeared in Green Lantern (vol. 2) #188 (May 1985).

Within the context of the stories, Bolphunga the Unrelenting has a love of destruction and plots to make a name for himself by challenging the most feared and mysterious beings in creation, fixating on Green Lanterns. This has led to his defeat by Mogo, Kilowog and Guy Gardner.

Bolphunga in other media
Bolphunga appears in the Green Lantern: Emerald Knights segment "Mogo Doesn't Socialize", voiced by Roddy Piper. This version is described as an undefeated and merciless warrior. While seeking to prove himself the most powerful being in the universe by defeating its most powerful warriors, he attempts to find and defeat Mogo, who eventually defeats and captures Bolphunga.

Boom
Boom is the name of different characters appearing in American comic books published by DC Comics.

Boom I
Boom is a rock-skinned alien who was previously locked into combat with another alien of his species named Thoom when they were recruited into the Poglachian Green Lantern Corps as part of the Weaponers of Qward's plot to discredit the real Green Lantern Corps.

Judy Garrick
In a bio panel of "The New Golden Age" one-shot, it revealed that Jay Garrick and Joan Garrick had a daughter named Judy Garrick who would later gain her super-speed powers the same way her dad did by the time that she was a teenager in 1963. At some point, Judy accidentally traveled back to the year 1940 during the earlier superhero work of Flash and took on the alias of "Boom". Before returning to her own time, Judy revealed her identity to her father. Boom would occasionally travel back in time to aid her dad where she even befriended Turtle's son Tortoise. Boom stopped visiting her dad in the past by the time she was born on February 14, 1949. Then one day, she mysteriously vanished. By the final issue of "Flashpoint Beyond", Judy was among the thirteen missing Golden Age superheroes in the Time Masters' capsules. When the capsules failed, they were all pulled back in time with history rebuilding around them.

Boom in other media
An unrelated Boom appears in Static Shock, voiced by Rickey D'Shon Collins. This version is Byron, a child who was exposed to mutagen leftover from the Big Bang and became a Bang Baby with a speaker in his chest capable of firing destructive soundwaves. He forces his sister Miranda to help him commit crimes before he is defeated by Static. In the series finale, Byron joins Ebon and the Meta-Breed to restore his powers, but is driven off by Static and Gear.

Booster Gold

Sy Borgman
Sy Borgman is a retired scooter-bound U.S. agent with some cybernetic enhancements and an ally of Harley Quinn that first appeared in Harley Quinn (vol. 2) #2 (March 2014) as part of The New 52.

Sy Borgman is a retired U.S. agent formerly called Syborg who was rendered scooter-bound and got cybernetic enhancements after stopping a terrorist plot. When Harley Quinn heads to her nursing home appointment, Sy Borgman recognizes her causing Harley to close the door behind her. He explains his history to her and states how he must use a scooter due to the weight of the cybernetics affecting his aged body. Sy wants to help Harley by targeting the gang that was responsible for his current cybernetic state. While going over the files, Harley and Sy start with Igor Lenivetskin, who is in a coma. They were able to sever the tubes going into him and set his body to explode. The second target is Ivana Brekemoff. Sy states Ivana will be more difficult than Igor. Upon entering the mansion by force, Harley and Sy confront Ivana who starts using an RPG on them, which blows up the mansion. Emerging unscathed, Harley and Sy flee from the police helicopter while throwing Ivana to her death. Their third target is Alexei "the Bear" Medvedenko, who currently works as a security guard at the Prospect Park Zoo. When they arrive, they find that Alexei had been torn apart by the zoo animals he released upon hearing that they were coming for him. The other people that Alexei called were also on the files and consist of Kosta Armanoleg, Borya Tatierski, Yuri Beyznatofin, and Zena Bendemova. Harley and Sy send explosive bagels their way, where Kosta, Yuri, and three of Kosta's henchwomen were caught in the explosions. Harley brings a metal pipe down on Borya's head, leaving Zena as the remaining target. While it was mentioned that Zena was an ex-lover of Sy, she is caught by surprise when Sy sends her scooter into Zena enough to send her flying into the horns of a rhinoceros. Then it comes to the final target that Sy foreshadowed, where he and Harley head to Coney Island and break into the bedroom of a man named Chuck. After a monologue by Sy about the car that Chuck sold him, Harley kicks Chuck out the window where he falls into the streets below. While Sy wanted to finish off Chuck, he relents.

When Harley Quinn is invited to the Skate Club by Summer Daze, she brings Sy Borgman along to accompany her. Harley Quinn learns that this roller derby has no rules, as Sy Borgman places a bet on Harley. When Sy gives Harley an explosive toothpaste to use on her opponent Maria Monsterella, it kills her, causing the match to be disqualified. Sy still managed to win his bets and allows Harley to pay for the meal that follows. Harley later packs Sy's wheelchair into his car and sees him off.

Sy Borgman in other media
Sy Borgman appears in Harley Quinn, voiced by Jason Alexander. This version is a cyborg landlord who used to work for the CIA as a fixer. Introduced in the episode "Finding Mr. Right", he reminds his tenant Poison Ivy of the rules before evicting her and her friends for breaking them. In the episode "Being Harley Quinn", Borgman finds Ivy and her friends' comatose bodies, assumes they are dead, and nearly kills them. Impressed by his skill, however, Harley Quinn offers him a place in her crew. In "L.O.D.R.S.V.P.", it is revealed that Borgman has a scientist sister named Mirielle. In the 1980s, he asked her to fuse a monkey and an octopus together into a "monkeypus" to assist him in the field. During the procedure however, the monkey escaped and fused Mirielle with the octopus, turning her into a mutant monster. Feeling guilty, Borgman hid her away in an abandoned mall. In the present, Borgman has Doctor Psycho use his psychic powers to help the former communicate and reconcile with Mirielle before releasing her onto the streets of Gotham City, where she goes on a rampage. In "Dye Hard", Psycho, having left the crew after being enraged by Harley in a previous episode, takes control of an army of Parademons and traps her in a force-field in an attempt to take over Gotham and exact revenge on her. Borgman gives his right eye to her as a memento before sacrificing himself to destroy the force-field so she can escape. In "Lover's Quarrel", Harley learns Borgman put a digital backup of his mind in the eye, allowing him to help Kite Man create anti-mind control devices to combat Doctor Psycho. As of "A Thief, A Mole, An Orgy", King Shark downloads Borgman's consciousness into Catwoman's apartment's smart home hub.

Bouncing Boy

Bozo the Iron Man

Brain

Brain Wave

Brainiac

Brainiac 2

Brainiac 3
Brainiac 3 is a fictional character appearing in American comic books published by DC Comics.

Lyrl Dox is a Coluan who is the son of Brainiac 2 and the Gryxian Stealth.

Brainiac 3 in other media
Brainiac 3 appears in the Legion of Super-Heroes film, voiced by Zeno Robinson.

Brainiac 4

Brainiac 5

Brainiac 8

Brainwave

Breathtaker
Breathtaker is a name of two supervillains appearing in DC Universe.

Breathtaker I
The first is an unnamed assassin and the leader of the Assassination Bureau. He first appeared in Firestorm (vol. 2) #29 (November 1984), created by Joey Cavalieri and Rafael Kayanan.

Humiliated and tormented by his peers throughout his adolescence for being an albino dwarf, the young man constructed a powerful exoskeleton, assumed the hood and the identity of Breathtaker. He formed Assassination Bureau, supplying super-powered assassins to anyone with the right price.

The Breathtaker first comes to public attention when the criminal group 2000 Committee hires him and his organization to capture Firestorm. He tests Firestorm with his several lesser agents before confronting him with the Bureau's two chief, Incognito and Mindboggler. When Firestorm defeats those two as well, the Breathtaker finally lures him to his headquarters and attempts to kill him. Instead, Firestorm destroys the complex, putting an end to the Breathtaker's career.

Breathtaker II
The second Breathtaker is an unnamed female assassin, first appearing in Titans #21 (November 2000), created by Jay Faerber and Paul Pelletier.

Born and raised in USA, Breathtaker obtained aerokinesis abilities in an unspecified way, apparently from her birth. Liking the powers, she became an international assassin. She is specialized in murdering people by sucking away the air from their lungs, making it look like a natural death. She later contacted other people with similar abilities to form a team named Hangmen, consisting of super-strong Stranglehold from Puerto Rico, the mind-controller Provoke from Australia, a young electricity-manipulator Shock Trauma from Japan, and the cyborg Killshot from Russia.

Their first assignment comes from the government of Qurac to eliminate the terrorist Cheshire who tried to nuke the entire place. Cheshire escaped from them, but Breathtaker found an easy way to get at her: she and her team target her daughter Lian Harper, to lure her out. Despite their attempts, Titans discover their plan and defeat them.

She and her team later have encounters with Nightwing and his team, sometimes allying with more seasoned and proficient assassins like Deathstroke. The team later makes an alliance with Alexander Luthor Jr. and his Secret Society of Super Villains. When the team assaults Metropolis, Breathtaker and her teammates use it as a cover to loot the city. Seeking an opportunity, they double cross Luthor and Breathtaker pays Doctor Psycho to fake their own death.

After her team laid low for a while, they come in contact by Libra, who was reforming Luthor's Society and offers them a prize. Although accepting, she is not interested in money and only accepted his offer because she wants to kill every Titan as a revenge. Despite of it, she and her team are later killed by Crispus Allen (the Spectre).

Breathtaker in other media
 Breathtaker appears in the Supergirl episode "In Plain Sight", portrayed by Luisa D'Oliveira. This version is a Leviathan operative and metahuman assassin who was sent to assassinate Elena Torres. Her plan is thwarted by Supergirl and is remanded to D.E.O. custody. In "Dangerous Liaisons", Breathtaker is interrogated by Alex Danvers about who hired her.
 Breathtaker appears in DC Universe Online.

Brick

Bronze Tiger

Brother Blood

Brutale

Bug-Eyed Bandit

Bulleteer

Bulletman and Bulletgirl

Bumblebee

Bushido

Byth Rok
Byth Rok is a supervillain appearing in American comic books published by DC comics, and who is commonly known as a recurring enemy of the Silver Age Hawkman. He was created by Gardner Fox and Joe Kubert, and first appeared in The Brave and the Bold #34 (February/March 1961), titled "Creature of a Thousand Shapes".

On the alien planet Thanagar, a scientist named Krotan developed a pill that would empower the mind to control the molecular formation of the body. Just as he was about to swallow it, a thief named Byth assaulted him and swallowed the pill. Byth first transformed into a bird and left (via spaceship) to commit crimes on other planets. Katar Hol and his wife, Shayera, tracked his rocket to Earth.

For many years, Byth would escape on several occasions only to be captured again by Hawkman and Hawkwoman.

In the Hawkworld mini-series, Byth is a corrupt Wingman commander and Katar Hol's superior. He manipulated a drug-induced Katar into killing his father, aiding his rise to power. Now Administrator of Protection, he gains his shape-shifting powers from a new drug called Krotan. Katar Hol, with the help of Shayera Thal, uncovers his schemes but Byth escapes arrest. He flees to Earth and runs criminal operations in Chicago. He supplies Carl Sands with a shadow generator. He is later captured, and returned to Thanagar.

Byth was apparently defeated for good by the then recently resurrected Carter Hall and Kendra Saunders.

In The New 52 reboot of DC's continuity, Lord Byth is shown to be responsible for the creation of Ultra the Multi-Alien where he had combined the DNA of the alien prisoners to make Ultra the Multi-Alien the Slayer of Worlds.

After consuming the Changeling Pill (or Krotan), Byth gained the ability to transform into any other person or animal at will, whether they were indigenous to Thanagar or originated on an alien world (including Earth). There appears to be no physical restriction in terms of mass or volume when it comes to Byth's shape-shifting talents.

Byth Rok in other media
 Byth appeared in Green Lantern: The Animated Series episode "Flight Club", voiced by Tom Kenny. He is the leader of a band of Thanagarian outlaws being interred in an intergalactic prison.
 Byth appeared in issue #9 of comic book series The All-New Batman: The Brave and the Bold. Batman and Hawkman teamed-up to defeat him and return him to Thanagar, awaiting trial.

References

 Firestorm titles

 Green Lantern titles

 DC Comics characters: B, List of